Masayoshi Kashiwagi (born 23 February 1949) is a Japanese alpine skier. He competed in two events at the 1972 Winter Olympics.

References

1949 births
Living people
Japanese male alpine skiers
Olympic alpine skiers of Japan
Alpine skiers at the 1972 Winter Olympics
Sportspeople from Hokkaido